Konstantinos Taxiarchis (born 2 April 1974) is a Greek former professional footballer who played as a midfielder.

References

1974 births
Living people
Greek footballers
Athlitiki Enosi Larissa F.C. players
Panachaiki F.C. players
Olympiacos Volos F.C. players
Ethnikos Asteras F.C. players
Veria F.C. players
Kastoria F.C. players
Trikala F.C. players
Panargiakos F.C. players
Apollon Smyrnis F.C. players
Apollon Larissa F.C. players
Super League Greece players
Association football midfielders
Footballers from Larissa